Mir Hussein bin Haydar (1797–1826) was the Uzbek Emir of Bukharan Emirate from October to December 1826. His father was emir Haydar bin Shahmurad (1800–1826). Emir Haydar died in October 1826 and was succeeded by his son Mir Hussein bin Haydar. 

Hussein ruled for only two months and fourteen days. According to local historian Ahmad Donish, “this emir has achieved extraordinary perfection and merit, he mastered all sciences, including foreign ones. He knew versification, medicine, alchemy and fortune telling".

Mir Hussein reigned for only two months and fourteen days (October–December 1826). According to some reports, he was poisoned by Hakim Kushbegi. Emir Mir Hussein died in December 1826 and was succeeded by Umar bin Haydar.

References

Literature
 Akhmad Donish, Puteshestviye iz Bukhary Peterburg. Dushanbe, 1960.
 Holzwarth, Wolfgang. "Community Elders and State Agents: Īlbēgīs in the Emirate of Bukhara around 1900." Eurasian Studies (2011).
 Bregel, Y. (2009). The new Uzbek states: Bukhara, Khiva and Khoqand: C. 1750–1886. In N. Di Cosmo, A. Frank, & P. Golden (Eds.), The Cambridge History of Inner Asia: The Chinggisid Age (pp. 392-411). Cambridge: Cambridge University Press

Emirs of Bukhara
1826 deaths
19th-century monarchs in Asia
People from Bukhara
1797 births